Back to Basics: Live and Down Under is the fourth video album by American singer-songwriter Christina Aguilera. It premiered on television on January 26, 2008, on VH1, and was released on DVD on February 4, 2008, by RCA Records. The DVD included material from recordings from two of Aguilera's concerts during her Back to Basics Tour in Adelaide on July 17 and 18, 2007. Behind-the-scenes footage is included with video from the concerts.

Upon its release, Back to Basics: Live and Down Under garnered positive views from music critics as well as attained chart success in a number of countries, peaking at number one on the DVD charts of Belgium (Flanders) and the United Kingdom. In the United States, the DVD debuted atop the chart with first-week sales of 18,437 copies. It achieved double platinum certification by the Australian Recording Industry Association (ARIA) and gold certification by Recording Industry Association of America (RIAA).

Background and release
To support Back to Basics (2006), Aguilera embarked on the worldwide concert Back to Basics Tour. The tour received mixed to positive reviews from music critics; The Georgia Straight'''s Mike Usinger praised Aguilera's vocals as "insanely powerful", while Dave Simpson from The Guardian criticized the setlist as "confusing". The show in Adelaide, Australia on July 17 and 18, 2007 was filmed and was released as a DVD.

On January 26, 2008, Back to Basics: Live and Down Under made it premiere on VH1 at 10 PM. The DVD was released officially on February 4, 2008, in the United Kingdom. The next day, it was released in Canada and the United States. In Germany, it was released on February 8, 2008. It was released on February 11 in France, and on February 16 in Australia. The DVD features old-school style materials such as trapeze artists, circus jugglers, and cabaret dancing. It also includes behind-the-scene interviews with dancers, musicians, stylists, Aguilera's husband Jordan Bratman and the singer herself.

 Critical response 

Upon its release, Back to Basics: Live and Down Under garnered mainly positive feedback from music critics. Jake Meaney for PopMatters gave it a seven out of ten stars rating, commenting it "huge and overwhelming, deeply soulful and expressive, if sometimes a bit unsubtly melismatic". Clayton Perry from the online website Blogcritics provided a positive review, writing that it "is more than a simple presentation of song and dance; the show, by all measures, is a Broadway-caliber production". The New York Times was also impressed toward the video release, writing that it is "at the top of her already speaker-blowing vocal range".

 Commercial performance 
On February 25, 2008, the DVD debuted and peaked at number 2 on the ARIA Music DVD Chart, where it remained its peak for two weeks. On the Austrian Music DVD Chart, it debuted at number 7 on the issue chart dated February 22, 2008. The following week, it fell to number 8. The DVD reached its peak at number 6 on March 14, 2008. In the Wallonia region of Belgium, Live and Down Under made its first chart appearance at number 10 on February 16, 2008. It subsequently peaked at number 8 the following week. In the Flanders region, the DVD peaked atop the chart on March 1, 2008, after two weeks charting within the top 10.

In New Zealand, it peaked at number 7 on the RIANZ DVD Chart and remained on the top ten for on week. It also peaked at number 6 in Austria, number 4 in Switzerland, number 2 in Dutch, and atop the chart of United Kingdom. In the United States, Back to Basics: Live and Down Under debuted at number one on the Billboard'' Top Music Videos chart on February 23, 2008, with first-week sales of 18,437 copies. It fell to number 3 the following week. On March 8, 2008, the DVD fell to number 4.

The DVD was certified gold by the Recording Industry Association of America (RIAA) for shipments of 50,000 copies in the United States. It was certified double platinum by the Australian Recording Industry Association (ARIA) for exceeding shipments of 30,000 copies in Australia.

Track listing
Credits adapted from DVD liner notes

Bonus content 
 "Dancers"
 "Wardrobe: Simone Harouche"
 "Hair & Make-Up: Stephen Sollitto"
 "Musicians"
 "Background Vocalists"
 "Musical Director: Rob Lewis"
 "Jordan Bratman"
 "Christina Aguilera"

Personnel 
 Christina Aguilera – vocals, primary artist, creative director
 Hamish Hamilton – director
 Sasha Allen, Erika Jerry – background vocals
 Irving Azoff, Kelly Perkins, Harry Sandler – management
 Errol Cooney – guitar
 Ethan Farmer – bass
 Irene Fukunaga – executive assistant
 Miguel Gandelman – saxophone
 James Glader – photography
 Jean-Pierre Leloir – photo courtesy
 Rob Lewis – music direction
 Peter Mokran – mixing
 Raymond "Ez" Monteiro – trumpet
 Garret Smith – trombone
 Eric Weaver – assistant
 Chris Woehrle – design
Credits adapted from AllMusic

Charts

Weekly charts

Year-end charts

Certifications

Release history

References

Christina Aguilera video albums
2008 video albums
2008 live albums
Live video albums
Films directed by Hamish Hamilton (director)